The 5000 and 10000 meters distances for men in the 2013–14 ISU Speed Skating World Cup was contested over six races on six occasions, out of a total of six World Cup occasions for the season, with the first occasion taking place in Calgary, Alberta, Canada, on 8–10 November 2013, and the final occasion taking place in Heerenveen, Netherlands, on 14–16 March 2014. Five of the races were over 5000 metres, and one race was over 10000 metres.

Jorrit Bergsma of the Netherlands successfully defended his title from the previous season, while Patrick Beckert of Germany came second, and Sven Kramer of the Netherlands came third.

Top three

Race medallists

Standings 
Standings as of 16 March 2014 (end of the season).

References 

 
Men 5000